Cobalt sulfide is the name for chemical compounds with a formula CoxSy.  Well-characterized species include minerals with the formula CoS, CoS2, Co3S4, and Co9S8. In general, the sulfides of cobalt are black, semiconducting, insoluble in water, and nonstoichiometric.

Minerals and hydrometallurgy
Cobalt sulfides occur widely as minerals, comprising major sources of all cobalt compounds.  Binary cobalt sulfide minerals include the cattierite (CoS2) and linnaeite (Co3S4).  CoS2 (see image in table) is isostructural with iron pyrite, featuring disulfide groups, i.e. Co2+S22−.  Linnaeite, also rare, adopts the spinel motif. The Co9S8 compound is known as a very rare cobaltpentlandite (the Co analogue of pentlandite).  Mixed metal sulfide minerals include carrollite (CuCo2S4) and siegenite (Co3−xNixS4).

CoS is known as jaipurite. However, this species is questionable.

Cobalt sulfide minerals are converted to cobalt via roasting and extraction into aqueous acid.  In some processes, cobalt salts are  purified by precipitation when aqueous solutions of cobalt(II) ions are treated with hydrogen sulfide.  Not only is this reaction useful in the purification of cobalt from its ores, but also in qualitative inorganic analysis.

Applications and research
In combination with molybdenum, the sulfides of cobalt are used as catalysts for the industrial process called hydrodesulfurization, which is implemented on a large scale in refineries.  Synthetic cobalt sulfides are widely investigated as electrocatalysts.

Selected literature

References

Cobalt sulfide, NIST Webbook

Cobalt(II) compounds
Sulfides